Benzilic acid is an organic compound with formula  or 2(HO)C(COOH).  It is a white crystalline aromatic acid, soluble in many primary alcohols.

Preparation
Benzilic acid can be prepared by a heating mixture of benzil, ethanol, and potassium hydroxide. 

Another preparation, performed by Liebig in 1838, is the dimerization of benzaldehyde, to benzil, which is transformed to the product by the benzilic acid rearrangement reaction.

Uses

Benzilic acid is used in the manufacture of glycollate pharmaceuticals including clidinium, dilantin, flutropium, and mepenzolate which are antagonists of the muscarinic acetylcholine receptors.  

It is used in manufacture of the incapacitating agent 3-quinuclidinyl benzilate (BZ) which is regulated by the Chemical Weapons Convention.  It is also monitored by law enforcement agencies of many countries, because of its use in the manufacture in hallucinogenic drugs.

References

External links 
Safety MSDS data
Solubility in alcohols
Converting Benzaldehyde to Benzilic Acid
Synthesis of Benzilic Acid

Benzhydryl compounds
Acetic acids